Kinjarapu is an Indian surname and may refer to:

 Kinjarapu Atchannaidu, Indian politician
Ram Mohan Naidu Kinjarapu (born 1987), Indian politician
 Kinjarapu Yerran Naidu (1957–2012), Indian politician